Achutupo is an island town in the San Blas archipelago of Panama, located  off the Kuna Yala comarca (district) coast. The island is sometimes called Isla Perro or Dog Island. 

Air Panama serves the town from the Achutupo Airport, which is on the mainland southwest of the island and is reached by boat.

Sources 

Populated places in Guna Yala